James Helmick Beatty (May 8, 1836 – October 21, 1927) was a United States district judge of the United States District Court for the District of Idaho.

Education and career

Born in Lancaster, Ohio, Beatty received an Artium Baccalaureus degree from Ohio Wesleyan University in 1858 and read law to enter the bar in 1862. He was superintendent of Jackson Public Schools in Jackson, Mississippi, from 1858 to 1861, and was in the United States Army during the American Civil War, serving as first lieutenant of the Fourth Iowa Battery from 1863 to 1865. Following the war, Beatty was in private practice in Missouri at Lexington from 1865 to 1872, also serving as a register in bankruptcy during that time. He was an Assistant United States Attorney in Salt Lake City, Utah Territory, from 1872 to 1882. Beatty returned to private practice in the Idaho Territory from 1882 to 1889 at Hailey, and was a Senator in the territorial legislature from 1886 to 1888. In May 1889, Beatty was appointed Chief Justice of the territorial court until it was dissolved when Idaho was admitted to the Union on July 3, 1890.

Federal judicial service

Beatty was nominated to the United States District Court for the District of Idaho on February 10, 1891, but the United States Senate never voted on his nomination, which expired with the sine die adjournment of the Senate on March 3, 1891.

Beatty received a recess appointment from President Benjamin Harrison on March 7, 1891, to the United States District Court for the District of Idaho, to a new seat authorized by 26 Stat. 215. He was nominated to the same position by President Harrison on December 10, 1891. He was confirmed by the United States Senate on February 4, 1892, and received his commission the same day. His service terminated on March 1, 1907, due to his retirement.

Opposition

Beatty's appointment was originally held up by Idaho's two United States Senators, William J. McConnell and George L. Shoup, leading to the failure of his first nomination and a delay in confirmation on his second nomination, but ultimately they abandoned their efforts to stop his appointment.

Death

Beatty lived another twenty years and died at age 91, on October 21, 1927, in Hollywood, California, and is buried at Hollywood Forever Cemetery (formerly Hollywood Memorial Cemetery).

References

Sources
 
 

1836 births
1927 deaths
19th-century American judges
19th-century American politicians
Idaho Territory judges
Judges of the United States District Court for the District of Idaho
Members of the Idaho Territorial Legislature
Ohio Wesleyan University alumni
Politicians from Jackson, Mississippi
People from Lancaster, Ohio
People of Iowa in the American Civil War
People of Ohio in the American Civil War
Politicians from Salt Lake City
United States federal judges appointed by Benjamin Harrison
United States Army officers
Lawyers from Jackson, Mississippi
United States federal judges admitted to the practice of law by reading law
Assistant United States Attorneys